César d'Estrées (5 February 1628 – 18 December 1714) was a French diplomat and cardinal.

Biography
Estrées was born and died in Paris.  He was the son of Marshal François Annibal d'Estrées and nephew of Gabrielle d'Estrées, mistress of King Henri IV. His brother was Marshal Jean II d'Estrées.

Estrées was abbot of the Abbey of Saint-Germain-des-Prés, Duke-Bishop of Laon and a cardinal. He was also French ambassador in Rome and Spain, commander in the Order of the Holy Spirit and a pair de France. He was elected member of the Académie française in 1658 (Seat 9).

References

Literature
 Charles Berton: Dictionnaire des cardinaux. Contenant des notions générales sur le cardinalat. J.-P. Migne, Paris 1857, col. 884–886
 Honoré Fisquet: La France pontificale (Gallia christiana), histoire chronologique et biographique des archevêques et évêques de tous les diocèses de France depuis l’établissement du christianisme jusqu’à nos jours, divisée en 17 provinces ecclésiastique. Vol. 2. E. Repos, Paris 1866, p. 306

External links

Florida University: Salvador Miranda, The Cardinals of the Holy Roman Church - César d'Estrées
 Académie française: Les Immortels - César d'Estrées
 Accademici della Crusca

1628 births
1714 deaths
Diplomats from Paris
18th-century French cardinals
Cardinal-bishops of Albano
Bishops of Laon
Members of the Académie Française
17th-century peers of France
Clergy from Paris